Ian Toyne (9 February 1930 – 2 March 1999) was an Australian rules footballer who played with Geelong and Melbourne in the Victorian Football League (VFL).

Notes

External links 

1930 births
1999 deaths
Australian rules footballers from Victoria (Australia)
Geelong Football Club players
Melbourne Football Club players
People educated at Geelong Grammar School